Muddula Mogudu may refer to:
 Muddula Mogudu (1983 film)
 Muddula Mogudu (1997 film)